Neyriz County is in Fars province, Iran. The capital of the county is the city of Neyriz. At the 2006 census, the county's population was 105,241 in 26,689 households. The following census in 2011 counted 113,750 people in 31,779 households. At the 2016 census, the county's population was 113,291 in 34,771 households. Abadeh Tashk District was separated from the county in 2018 to form Bakhtegan County.

Administrative divisions

The population history and structural changes of Neyriz County's administrative divisions over three consecutive censuses are shown in the following table. The latest census shows four districts, nine rural districts, and four cities.

References

 

Counties of Fars Province